During the 1993–94 English football season, Barnsley F.C. competed in the Football League First Division.

Season summary
In June 1993, Barnsley appointed Viv Anderson as player-manager but endured a poor 1993–94 season and were stuck in a relegation battle for most of the season but a good run of 7 wins from 9 league games in the 2nd half of the season (picking up 21 points out of the possible 27), was just enough to keep the Tykes in the division despite losing 7 out of the final 10 league games.

Final league table

Results
Barnsley's score comes first

Legend

Football League First Division

FA Cup

League Cup

Squad

Left the club during season

References

Barnsley F.C. seasons
Barnsley